Phil Sokolof (December 15, 1921 – April 15, 2004) was a multi-millionaire businessman and campaigner against heart disease. In the 1980s and early 1990s, his fight for heart health targeted the restaurant chain McDonald's. He is credited with using his own assets to help spur notable changes. The Los Angeles Times eulogized Sokolof saying, "In our big, complex bureaucratized society, there was indeed a case where one person made a difference, and where an idea had definite and beneficial consequences."

His research led him to believe that high-fat foods were the primary culprit behind cardiovascular disease, so in the 1980s he founded the National Heart Savers Association.

Sokolof's efforts regarding the McDonald's menu ended the practice of cooking their French fries in beef tallow. He also waged campaigns against the use of so-called "tropical" oils, such as coconut and palm oils, which were used to manufacture many cookies and crackers. According to the Los Angeles Times, Sokolof's campaign forced several manufacturers, including Ralston Purina, Borden, Pillsbury, Quaker Oats, Sunshine Biscuits, Pepperidge Farm, and Keebler to end their use of tropical oils in their products.

After those achievements, Sokolof's public profile was reduced, but he continued his struggle, primarily against fat in the diet. In 1995, Bryant Gumbel introduced him to debate the Today show as "America's No. 1 Cholesterol Fighter". Sokolof took out ads decrying the popularity of 2% milk, arguing that it is not low-fat, and encouraged parents to only buy skim milk. In 1997, he urged Michael Jordan and Tiger Woods not to endorse McDonald's. In 2002, Sokolof briefly returned to his full-page ad purchasing practice to discourage fellow Omaha native Warren Buffett from purchasing Burger King. 

Sokolof died on April 15, 2004 of heart failure at the age of 82.

References

1921 births
2004 deaths
American health activists